Farmers is an unincorporated community and census-designated place in Rowan County, Kentucky, United States. Its population was 284 as of the 2010 census. Farmers has a post office with ZIP code 40319. U.S. Route 60 passes through the community.

Geography

Demographics

American Civil War 
Next to the side of U.S. Route 60 in Farmers, is a historical plaque commemorating the passing through of Confederate General John Hunt Morgan's group "Morgan's Raiders." Engraved it reads, "On last tragic raid, the fourth into Kentucky, Morgan's Raiders took Mt. Sterling, then lost it, took Lexington and June 11, 1864 took Cynthiana. Next day USA men under Brig. General S. G. Burbridge dispersed raiders. Morgan then retreated through Flemingsburg and camped here June 12. He and his men returned to Virginia, but never recovered from this reverse."

References

Unincorporated communities in Rowan County, Kentucky
Unincorporated communities in Kentucky
Census-designated places in Rowan County, Kentucky
Census-designated places in Kentucky
American Civil War